Fieldbrook (formerly Bokman's Prairie and Buckman's Prairie) is a census-designated place in Humboldt County, California. The population was at 860 at the 2010 census.

Geography

Located on the edge of the dense redwood forest, the area was once home to thriving lumber companies. Fieldbrook is at the northern edge of the McKinleyville-Arcata-Eureka-Fortuna corridor along US Highway 101, where about eighty percent of Humboldt County's population lives and most of its businesses are located. The ZIP Code is 95519. The community is inside area code 707.

Fieldbrook is located at the right-angle bend where Murray Road becomes Fieldbrook Road. In the mid-1990s, Fieldbrook was a stereotypical sleepy country hamlet, with junk cars sitting in weedy yards along the main road in one block and goats grazing alongside a church in the next. With the decline of the local timber industry, the increase of remote working professionals, and the emergence of the North Coast as a retirement destination, Fieldbrook with its mild weather (summer temperatures seldom exceed  and winter nights rarely drop below  has undergone gentrification. Sprawling ranch-style (single-story) homes on isolated  lots wedged between timber tracts are selling for $500,000, and at least one  timber tract has become a gated community.

The few blocks of paved and unpaved roads that comprise Fieldbrook property include modest homes, an elementary school and two churches, as well as a general store, a winery and an apple orchard that host public events. Larger residences whose owners identify with the Fieldbrook community continue south along Fieldbrook Road as it heads inland and uphill  to the small city of Blue Lake (population 1,200) at the foot of the Coast Range.

Fieldbrook is very nearly on the north bank of the Mad River, which flows into the Pacific Ocean between Arcata and McKinleyville. Although the Mad River supplies the water to much of Humboldt County's population, the small population does not have a significant impact on the river's flow. A narrow zone adjacent to the road is maintained as an unlogged buffer, presenting the illusion of virgin forest to tourists, but even on the north side of the buffer, in any given year the majority of the timber tracts have been growing for at least seven years, comprising a wilderness if not exactly parkland. The region abounds with wildlife and residents routinely find deer and elk grazing in their yards, foxes and raccoons digging through their garbage, and the occasional black bear or cougar.

History
A post office operated in Fieldbrook from 1902 to 1932. In the late 1800s to early 1900s, much of Fieldbrook was owned by lumber companies. Railroad lines ran through Fieldbrook to the Humboldt Bay.

Education
Fieldbrook is the seat of the Fieldbrook Elementary School District, and home of the Fieldbrook School, a public K-8 school.

Demographics
The 2010 United States Census reported that Fieldbrook had a population of 859. The racial makeup of Fieldbrook was 763 (88.8%) White, 4 (0.5%) African American, 19 (2.2%) Native American, 5 (0.6%) Asian, 0 (0.0%) Pacific Islander, 14 (1.6%) from other races, and 54 (6.3%) from two or more races. 51 persons (5.9%) were Hispanic or Latino of any race.

The Census reported that 859 people (100% of the population) lived in households, with 0 (0%) living institutionalized or in non-institutionalized group quarters. 

There were 347 households, out of which 90 (25.9%) had children under the age of 18 living in them, 190 (54.8%) were opposite-sex married couples living together, 26 (7.5%) had a female householder with no husband present, 16 (4.6%) had a male householder with no wife present. There were 27 (7.8%) unmarried opposite-sex partnerships, and 8 (2.3%) same-sex married couples or partnerships. 72 households (20.7%) were made up of single individuals, and 23 of these (6.6%) had someone living alone who was 65 years of age or older. The average household size was 2.48. There were 232 families (66.9% of all households); the average family size was 2.87.

The population was spread out, with 162 people (18.9%) under the age of 18, 55 people (6.4%) aged 18 to 24, 190 people (22.1%) aged 25 to 44, 351 people (40.9%) aged 45 to 64, and 101 people (11.8%) who were 65 years of age or older. The median age was 47.0 years. For every 100 females of any age, there were 100.2 males. For every 100 females age 18 and over, there were 96.9 males.

There were 377 housing units at an average density of 36.0 per square miles (13.9/km2), of which 347 were occupied, 281 (81.0%) were owner-occupied, and 66 (19.0%) were occupied by renters. The homeowner vacancy rate was 0.4%; the rental vacancy rate was 6.8%. 710 people (82.7% of the population) lived in owner-occupied housing units and 149 people (17.3%) lived in rental housing units.

Government

Federally, Fieldbrook is in California's 2nd congressional district, represented by Jared Huffman.

See also

References

Census-designated places in Humboldt County, California
Census-designated places in California